Wasmanniella is a genus of midges in the family Cecidomyiidae. The three described species are known from the holarctic and oriental regions. The genus was established by French entomologist Jean-Jacques Kieffer in 1898.

Species
 Wasmanniella aptera Kieffer, 1898
 Wasmanniella clauda Pritchard, 1951
 Wasmanniella indica Grover, 1970

References

Cecidomyiidae genera

Insects described in 1898
Taxa named by Jean-Jacques Kieffer